Lemuel Jeanpierre (born May 19, 1987) is an American football coach and former player who is the assistant offensive line coach for the Miami Dolphins of the National Football League (NFL). In his playing career, he was a center for the Seattle Seahawks, having signed as an undrafted free agent in 2010. He played college football at South Carolina.

Playing career

Seattle Seahawks
Jeanpierre was signed by the Seattle Seahawks as an undrafted free agent following the end of the NFL lockout in 2011. Jeanpierre was originally released from the Seahawks before the 2014 season began. He was resigned in November after an injury to the starting center, Max Unger Jeanpierre became a free agent on August 31, 2015, after the Seahawks terminated his contract.  Jeanpierre was re-signed by Seattle during Week 7 of the 2015 season after Patrick Lewis sustained an injury

Detroit Lions
On August 17, 2016, Jeanpierre signed with the Detroit Lions. On September 3, he was released by the Lions.

Coaching career

Seattle Seahawks
On July 28, 2017, Jeanpierre was signed as an offensive assistant by the Seattle Seahawks under head coach Pete Carroll.

Oakland / Las Vegas Raiders
On April 3, 2018, Jeanpierre was hired by the Oakland Raiders as an assistant offensive line coach under head coach Jon Gruden.

Miami Dolphins 
On February 20, 2020, Jeanpierre was hired by the Miami Dolphins to be their assistant offensive line coach under head coach Brian Flores. On January 19, 2021, Jeanpierre was promoted to offensive line coach. He was retained by Mike McDaniel as the assistant offensive line coach for the 2022 season.

Personal life
Jeanpierre is of Haitian descent, whose grandfather migrated to Louisiana.

References

External links
 Seattle Seahawks bio
 South Carolina Gamecocks bio

Living people
American football offensive guards
American football centers
American sportspeople of Haitian descent
South Carolina Gamecocks football players
Seattle Seahawks players
Detroit Lions players
1987 births
People from Marrero, Louisiana
Players of American football from Louisiana
Seattle Seahawks coaches
Oakland Raiders coaches
Miami Dolphins coaches
Timber Creek High School alumni